Lady Chatterley's Lover is a 1981 erotic romantic drama film directed by Just Jaeckin, based on D. H. Lawrence's 1928 novel of the same name. The film stars Sylvia Kristel and Nicholas Clay.

Plot 
After a Great War injury leaves her Baronet husband Sir Clifford Chatterley impotent and crippled, his new wife, Constance Chatterley (called Connie) is torn between love for her husband and her own sensual desires. With her husband's consent, even encouragement, even to the point of bearing him an heir, she is open to means of fulfilling her physical needs. She clandestinely observes their gamekeeper, Oliver Mellors, washing himself at his hut, and is immediately attracted, and uses that image to masturbate in bed that very evening. As she later approaches him at his hut openly, he shows disdain for her prying, due to class differences, he being a common laborer, and she a middling aristocrat.

A later visit to his hut, ostensibly to view newly hatched birds, she sobs at their condition, and Mellors gently takes her in his arms, whereupon they begin a physical relationship. The physical affair between Connie and Mellors grows into love, and they both desire that she should have his child. Gradually, Sir Clifford begins to suspect the affair. After several more clandestine copulations, the lovers agree that Connie should spend an entire night at his cottage. So she does, and it is on this night that Clifford painfully pulls himself to her upstairs bedroom, only to find an empty bed. When Connie returns to the mansion at daybreak, Sir Clifford awaits her. He is shocked and angry that his wife should descend to bedding a member of the lower classes. He sends his wife off to Venice, and fires Mellors. Connie, discovering that she is pregnant, attempts a return to Sir Clifford, only to be rebuffed, as no child of a commoner shall be an heir of his. But she remains in the mansion, while Mellors awaits the finalization of a divorce from his first wife, who never appears in the film.

Cast

Production 
At one stage, Ken Russell had considered filming the book, but lost the rights. When he heard who was making it he said, "unless the director has turned over a new leaf, Lady Chatterly's Lover is going to be a glossy facile romp in the woods, romp after romp after romp."

Star Kristel said she was ". . . sad that some people may feel the film was 'soft porn'. Just Jaeckin and I have been persecuted by this sort porn criticism. I don't want to go through the same nightmare as I did after Emmanuelle."

"We are not making an X-rated picture", said executive producer Yoram Globus. "This will be a cult film. Nudity depends on how you shoot it."

Reception 
The film was not as popular as the filmmakers expected and Cannon Films ended up recording a loss. However, the film later became more popular in the home video market, as well as constant late night showings on premium cable channels such as Cinemax and Showtime in the mid to late 1980s.

See also 
 Lady Chatterley, 2006 film
 Ladt Chatterley's Lover, 2015 film

References

External links 
 
 
 
 

1981 films
1981 romantic drama films
1980s English-language films
1980s erotic drama films
British erotic drama films
British romantic drama films
Columbia Pictures films
English-language French films
English-language German films
Erotic romance films
Films about adultery in the United Kingdom
Films based on Lady Chatterley's Lover
Films directed by Just Jaeckin
Films scored by Richard Harvey
Films scored by Stanley Myers
Films set in the 1920s
Films set in England
Films shot at EMI-Elstree Studios
French erotic drama films
French romantic drama films
German erotic drama films
German romantic drama films
Golan-Globus films
West German films
1980s British films
1980s French films
1980s German films